James O. Robinson Jr. (1918–1967) was an American film actor.

Early life

Robinson was born on 30 July 1918, in Los Angeles, California, as the son of James O. Robinson Sr.

Career

He played the role of "Hambone" Johnson in Fontaine Fox's Mickey McGuire film series of short subjects. He was in the series from its beginning in 1927 until its end in 1934, appearing in most of the shorts in series. During his Mickey McGuire days, Robinson also appeared in other films, such as Tenderfeet and Penrod and Sam. After the McGuire series, Robinson continued to act, but mostly in bit parts.

Death

Robinson died from an illness on 2 November 1967, at the age of 49, in his California home.

Filmography

See also
 Mickey McGuire (1927–1934)
 Mickey Rooney
 Billy Barty
 Delia Bogard

External links

American male film actors
African-American male actors
1918 births
1967 deaths
African-American male child actors
American male child actors
20th-century American male actors
20th-century African-American people